Soraya Rahim Sobhrang is an Afghan politician, physician, and human rights activist serving as the commissioner of women's rights of the Afghan Independent Human Rights Commission. 

Sobhrang was born in Herat and completed medical school at Kabul University. She later emigrated to Germany. Sobhrang returned to Afghanistan in 1981 to work as the technical and political deputy minister at the Ministry of Women's Affairs. In March 2006, she was named by president Hamid Karzai as the women's affairs minister but her candidacy was not approved by the House of the People. She received the 2010 Front Line Award for Human Rights Defenders at Risk.

References 

Living people
Year of birth missing (living people)
People from Herat
Kabul University alumni
21st-century Afghan politicians
21st-century Afghan women politicians
Afghan women activists
Afghan human rights activists
Afghan women physicians
20th-century women physicians
21st-century women physicians